Tijuana is a city in Baja California, Mexico.

Tijuana may also refer to:

 Tijuana Municipality
 Tijuana metropolitan area
 Tijuana River

See also

 Playas de Tijuana
 Tijuana River Estuary
 Tijuana Cartel